MacFarland House, also known as MacFarland-Ruby-Crowley-Hubbard House, is a historic home located at Charleston, West Virginia.  It was built in 1836 and is one of only six pre-American Civil War houses still standing in the city.  The house features a full two-story modified Roman Doric portico.

It was listed on the National Register of Historic Places in 1979.

References

Houses in Charleston, West Virginia
Neoclassical architecture in West Virginia
Houses completed in 1836
Houses on the National Register of Historic Places in West Virginia
National Register of Historic Places in Charleston, West Virginia